The Women's giant slalom competition of the Sarajevo 1984 Olympics was held at Jahorina on Monday, February 13. Because of weather delays with the downhills, this was the first alpine event of these Olympics.

The defending world champion was Erika Hess of Switzerland, while American Tamara McKinney was the defending World Cup giant slalom champion, and Hess led the current season. Defending Olympic champion Hanni Wenzel was banned from these Olympics.

American Debbie Armstrong won the gold medal, teammate Christin Cooper took the silver, and Perrine Pelen of France was the bronze medalist. McKinney was fourth and Hess was seventh.

Entering the Olympics, the twenty-year-old Armstrong's only World Cup top ten finish in giant slalom was a fifth place in late January, and her sole career World Cup podium came three weeks before that; a third in a Super-G.

Results
The race was started at 10:00 local time, (UTC+1), and the second run began at 13:30.

References

External links
FIS results

Women's giant slalom
Oly
Alp